The Toyota KD engine series is a diesel engine produced by Toyota which appeared in 2000.

1KD-FTV 

First appearing in August, 2000, the 1KD-FTV was the first iteration of this generation and was first used in the J90 Toyota Land Cruiser Prado starting in July 2000.

The 1KD-FTV is a  straight-four common rail D-4D (Direct injection four-stroke common-rail Diesel) diesel engine with a variable nozzle turbocharger (VNT) and Intercooler. It has 16 valves and a double overhead camshaft (DOHC) design. In some markets, outputs are / and /. Redline of this engine is at 4200 rpm. Compression ratio is 17.9:1.

This is combined with a 32-bit ECU which controls fuel quantity, valve timing, and boost pressure at different engine parameters resulting in best fuel economy and also full utilization of power during acceleration. Pilot injection is also utilized by the common rail fuel system to smooth engine operation. Small amounts of fuel are introduced into the combustion chamber prior to the main injection event, reducing lag time and promoting more continuous and complete combustion. Exterior and interior engine noise is also reduced.

The 1KD engine produces 17% more power with 11% less fuel consumption than its predecessor, the 1KZ engine.
 
This engine was first used in Toyota Land Cruiser Prado, third-generation Hilux Surf, fifth-generation HiAce and now used in the Toyota Fortuner and Toyota Hilux.

2KD-FTV

The displacement of this engine is based on the previous 2L engine. It has 16 valves and is a DOHC engine with a turbocharger and intercooler.

Toyota Thailand, has updated the turbocharger to variable nozzle turbo (VNT) with intercooler.

The compression ratio is 18.5:1. The Redline of this engine is 4400  RPM. This engine also uses D-4D Common Rail (Common rail direct fuel injection) technology. The manufacturer's default injection timing is 6.5 deg before TDC. The only major changes from the 1KD-FTV to the 2KD-FTV were the bore and the stroke.

In 2005, Denso Corporation introduced the 3rd generation of Common Rail System (CRS) on the next 2KD-FTV engine (2005). In this engine, the compression ratio was reduced to 17.4:1 with high pressure and multiple diesel injections. The multiple injections consist of pilot injection and the main injection, in order to shorten the ignition delay, reduce the noise, and  emission.

The pilot injection timing is 5-6 deg before TDC (dependent on the correction factor by the ECU) while the main injection timing is on the TDC. However, the pilot injection is repealed as the engine speed reaches 2200 rpm and above at low load conditions.

This engine is used in the Toyota Hilux, Toyota Fortuner, Toyota Innova and Toyota Hiace. In some Central and South American countries, Toyota also offered this engine on the 2003-2006 4Runner in limited quantities.

See also 

 List of Toyota engines

References

KD
Diesel engines by model
Straight-four engines